The Australian Memorial Park is a World War I memorial, located near Fromelles, France, commemorating Australians killed during the Battle of Fromelles.

Location
It lies at the point where the German lines crossed the road, and has several surviving battlefield fortifications. In comparison, the V.C. Corner cemetery and memorial is approximately at the point where the Allied lines crossed the road.

Inauguration
The Memorial Park was opened on 5 July 1998 by Bruce Scott, the Australian Minister for Veterans' Affairs, in the presence of Ian McLachlan, the Australian Minister for Defence. The opening of this memorial park was part of a series of events that commemorated the 80th anniversary of the end of World War I. A guard of honour was provided by the French 43rd Infantry Regiment, and the Australian 10th/27th Battalion, and the opening of the memorial park was attended by hundreds from Australia and France.

Memorial

Cobbers is a prominent 1998 sculpture by Peter Corlett of Sergeant Simon Fraser rescuing a wounded compatriot from No Man's Land after the battle. A replica of the sculpture is in the Shrine of Remembrance in Melbourne, Victoria. The title comes from a letter that Fraser, a farmer from Byaduk, Victoria, wrote a few days after the battle and that was widely quoted in Australia's official history of World War I.

Several commemorative events have been held at the Memorial Park. On 9 May 2009, a Service of Remembrance was held to mark the 94th anniversary of the Battle of Aubers Ridge. On 19 July 2009, a service was held to mark the 93rd anniversary of the Battle of Fromelles.

See also

 Mont Saint-Quentin Australian war memorial
 V.C. Corner Australian Cemetery and Memorial
 Villers–Bretonneux Australian National Memorial
 Military Memorials of National Significance in Australia

Notes and references

Notes

References

External links

Australian military memorials
World War I memorials in France
Nord (French department)
Australian diaspora in Europe
Buildings and structures completed in 1998